Elvis' 40 Greatest is a compilation album by American singer and musician Elvis Presley. It was released in 1974 and was the UK's biggest-selling album over the Christmas period of that year, but along with all albums on K-tel, Ronco and Arcade, it was ineligible for the UK Albums Chart until 1975 because it was felt that heavy TV advertising and low pricing distorted the charts.  It finally reached number one on the UK Albums Chart in 1977, and became the 10th best-selling album of the 1970s in the UK.

It was originally pressed with a brown cover and doctored image of Elvis, with blue labels, this short lived pressing was replaced by yellow label copies.  The 1977 release, which appeared on the new RCA blue "signature" label, credited to "RCA Special Products", was released simultaneously on black vinyl and a more expensive pink vinyl edition.  The black vinyl sold a stagger 250'000 copies LESS than the pink vinyl, making it the more collectable item, even though fans are often tricked in to thinking the pink vinyl is "rare". It is in fact one of the most common and best selling Elvis compilation albums of all time.

Track listing

Chart performance

Weekly charts

Year-end charts

Certifications and sales

References

1975 compilation albums
Elvis Presley compilation albums